The 1996 Churchill Insurance World Indoor Bowls Championship  was held at Preston Guild Hall, Preston, England, from 11–24 February 1996.
David Gourlay won the title beating Hugh Duff in the final.

Ian Schuback and Kelvin Kerkow won the Pairs title.

The Women's World Championship took place in Guernsey from April 20–21. The event was won by Sandy Hazell.

Winners

Draw and results

Men's singles

Notes 
+ Margaret Johnston & Joyce Lindores were invited to play in the Men's Singles event.

Mark McMahon formerly of Hong Kong switched nations to represent Australia.

Men's Pairs

Women's singles

References

External links 
Official website

World Indoor Bowls Championship
1996 in bowls